The Southern Kings participated in their first ever Super Rugby competition in 2013. They won three, drew one and lost twelve of their matches during the regular season to finish fifth and last in the South African Conference and fifteenth and last on the overall log. Their top try scorer in the competition was Wimpie van der Walt, who got six tries, and their top points scorer was Demetri Catrakilis, who scored 142 points. The Lions beat them 44–42 on aggregate to return to Super Rugby in 2014 at the expense of the Kings.

It was also their final season in Super Rugby until 2016, when they returned after the Super Rugby competition was expanded to 18 teams.

Chronological list of events

 24 November 2012: A 51-man Southern Kings wider training squad is announced prior to the 2013 Super Rugby season.
 27 November 2012: Despite not being named in the initial training group, Director of Rugby Alan Solomons confirms that Kenyan loose-forward Daniel Adongo will also join up with the team.
 17 December 2012: The Kings sign French hooker Virgile Lacombe.
 7 January 2013: The wider training squad is cut to a core training squad of 40 players, with 13 players moving to the Vodacom Cup squad instead.
 14 January 2013: Boetie Britz is recalled to the Southern Kings training squad following a knee injury to Hannes Franklin.
 22 January 2013: The Kings beat Varsity Cup side  28–12 in a warm-up game.
 1 February 2013: The Kings beat a Franchise XV – effectively the  – 29–13 in a warm-up game.
 6 February 2013: The kit for the Super Rugby season is officially launched.
 12 February 2013: The Southern Kings core training squad is further reduced to 35 players, with seven players – Boetie Britz, Wesley Dunlop, Ross Geldenhuys, Lizo Gqoboka, Scott Mathie, Siviwe Soyizwapi and Wayne Stevens – moving to the Vodacom Cup squad instead, while  prop Grant Kemp is a new inclusion in the squad.
7 June 2013: Two Kings players join French teams for the 2013–14 season; prop Kevin Buys joins Top 14 side CA Brive and fly-half Wesley Dunlop joins Fédérale 1 side US Montauban.
2 July 2013: Kings players Virgile Lacombe and Tomás Leonardi both leave the club after the contracts expire.

Personnel

Squad

The following players were named in the Kings squad for the 2013 Super Rugby season:

Coaches and management

The Kings coaching and management staff for the 2013 Super Rugby season were:

Season

Log

The final log standings in the 2013 Super Rugby season were:

The final log standings in the 2013 Super Rugby promotion/relegation play-off were:

Round-by-round

The Kings' round-by-round progression throughout the season was:

Matches

The results of the Kings' matches during the season were:

Player statistics

The Super Rugby appearance record for players that represented the Kings in 2013 is as follows:

See also

 Southern Kings
 2013 Super Rugby season

External links

References

2013 Super Rugby season by team
2013 in South African rugby union
2013